Hechtia texensis, commonly known as Texas false agave, is a species of bromeliad that is native to the Trans-Pecos of Texas in the United States and northeastern Mexico (Chihuahua, Coahuila, Zacatecas).

References

External links

texensis
Plants described in 1885
Flora of the Chihuahuan Desert
Flora of Northeastern Mexico
Flora of Texas